Sergei Vladimirovich Kopylov (born 29 July 1960 in Tula) is a racing cyclist from the Soviet Union.

He competed for the Soviet Union in the 1980 Summer Olympics held in Moscow, Soviet Union in the individual sprint event, where he finished in third place. In 1981, he won the world amateur sprint championship gold medal. In 1982, he successfully defended his title against his main rival of the time, East Germany's Lutz Heßlich. In 1983, he focused on the 1 km time trial, capturing the world championship in Switzerland. The Soviet boycott of the 1984 Los Angeles Olympics prevented him from competing for an Olympic gold medal.

References

External links 
 

1960 births
Living people
Cyclists at the 1980 Summer Olympics
Olympic bronze medalists for the Soviet Union
Olympic cyclists of the Soviet Union
Sportspeople from Tula, Russia
Soviet male cyclists
Olympic medalists in cycling
Russian male cyclists
Medalists at the 1980 Summer Olympics